The Anatolian Greeks, also known as Asiatic Greeks or Asia Minor Greeks, make up the ethnic Greek populations who lived in Anatolia from 1200s BCE as a result of Greek colonization  until the forceful population exchange between Greece and Turkey in 1923, though some communities in Anatolia survive to the present day.

Cappadocian Greeks 

Cappadocian Greeks also known as Greek Cappadocians or simply Cappadocians are an ethnic Greek community native to the geographical region of Cappadocia in central-eastern Anatolia.

Pontic Greeks 

Other Anatolian Greeks 
 Asiatic Aeolian Greeks
 Asiatic Ionian Greeks
 Asiatic Dorian Greeks
 Antigonid Greeks

Historical context 
 Pontic colonies (classical antiquity)
 Hellenistic Anatolia (Hellenistic and Roman era)
 Byzantine Anatolia (Middle Ages)
 Ottoman Greeks (early modern), the Republic of Turkey's predecessor
 Greeks in Turkey (modern), Greek and Greek-speaking Eastern Orthodox Christians
 Greek refugees

References

Greeks from the Ottoman Empire